Arms Collector is the second album by the Russian band Splean, released in 1996.

Track listing

Demo version 
The demo version of the album includes 8 tracks. One of the tracks,  "Kuda letit moi samolyot?", was not included in the final version of album. The name of the track "Strannaya pesnya" was changed to "Samovar" in the original release.

Original release

Personnel

Aleksandr Vasilyev – vocals, lyrics
Aleksandr Morozov – bass guitar
Nikolai Rostovskii – keyboards
Nikolai Lysov – drums
Stas Berezovskii – guitar
Nikolai Panov – saxophone

External links 

 

1994 albums
SNC Records albums
Splean albums